The 1975 Chattanooga Moccasins football team was an American football team that represented the University of Tennessee at Chattanooga during the 1975 NCAA Division II football season. In their third year under head coach Joe Morrison, the team compiled a 5–5–1 record.

Schedule

References

Chattanooga
Chattanooga Mocs football seasons
Chattanooga Moccasins football